David Faderne (born 15 January 1970) is a French former professional footballer who played as a forward. He is the manager of USC Corte. He played in Ligue 1 with SC Bastia and AC Ajaccio.

References

External links
 

1970 births
Living people
Footballers from Metz
Association football forwards
French footballers
FC Gueugnon players
Amiens SC players
AC Ajaccio players
SC Bastia players
Stade Malherbe Caen players
Ligue 1 players
Ligue 2 players